Eric Reichman (25 August 1904 – 19 June 1984) was an Australian rules footballer who played with Fitzroy in the Victorian Football League (VFL).

Notes

External links 

Eric Reichman's playing statistics from The VFA Project

1904 births
1984 deaths
Australian rules footballers from Victoria (Australia)
Fitzroy Football Club players
Brunswick Football Club players
Preston Football Club (VFA) players